A dungeon is an underground prison or vault.

Dungeon or donjon may also refer to:

Games 
 Dungeon (video game), a 1975 mainframe role-playing game
 Dungeon!, a board game published 1975 as part of the Dungeons & Dragons franchise
 Dungeon! (video game), a 1982 video game adaptation of the board game
 The Dungeon (1993 video game), an Acorn Archimedes role-playing game
 Donjon (role-playing game), a 2002 role-playing game
 Dungeons (video game), a 2011 strategy video game
 Dungeon, an alternative name for Zork, a computer game

Literature
 Dungeon (comics), a series of comic books created by Joann Sfar and Lewis Trondheim, originally published under the French title Donjon
 Dungeon series, a series of fantasy novels written under the auspices of Philip José Farmer
 Dungeon (magazine), an official magazine of the Dungeons & Dragons franchise

Places
 Fort Purcell, Tortola - commonly referred to as "The Dungeon".

Other uses 
 The Dungeon (1922 film), an American silent film directed by Oscar Michaeux
 Dungeon (band), an Australian power metal musical group
 Dungeon (BDSM), a playspace for BDSM activities
 Hart Dungeon or The Dungeon, a wrestling school in Calgary, Alberta, Canada
 The Dungeons, a series of tourist attractions owned by Merlin Entertainment

See also 
 Dungeon Master (disambiguation)
 Dungeons & Dragons (disambiguation)